Who Was the Other Man? is a 1917 American silent war drama film directed by Francis Ford and starring Ford, Duke Worne and William T. Horne.

Cast
 Francis Ford as James Walbert / Ludwig Schumann
 Duke Worne as Herbert Cornell
 William T. Horne as Sen. Washburn
 Beatrice Van as Wanda Bartell
 Mae Gaston as Marion Washburn

References

Bibliography
 Scott Eyman. Print the Legend: The Life and Times of John Ford. Simon and Schuster, 2012.

External links
 

1917 films
1910s war films
1910s English-language films
American silent feature films
American war films
American black-and-white films
Universal Pictures films
Films directed by Francis Ford
Silent war films
1910s American films